The greater ground robin (Amalocichla sclateriana) is a species of bird in the family Petroicidae. It is found in New Guinea.

Taxonomy and systematics 
There are two recognised subspecies of the greater ground robin:

 A. s.  sclateriana - The nominate subspecies, found in the mountains of the Huon Peninsula.
 A. s. occidentalis - Found in the Oranje Mountains in central New Guinea. It has browner and more mottled underparts than the nominate subspecies does.

Description 

Distribution and habitat 
It is endemic to New Guinea.

Behaviour and ecology

Diet 
It feeds on invertebrates, such as beetles.

References

Cited text 

 

greater ground robin
Birds of New Guinea
greater ground robin
Taxonomy articles created by Polbot